Vohemar District (also Vohimarina District) is a district in northern Madagascar. It is a part of Sava Region and borders the districts of Sambava to the south, Ambilobe to the west and Antsiranana II to the north. Its capitol is Vohemar.

Communes
The district is further divided into 19 communes:

 Ambalasatrana
 Ambinanin'andravory
 Amboriala
 Ampanefena
 Ampisikina
 Ampondra
 Andrafainkona
 Andravory
 Antsahavaribe
 Antsirabe Nord
 Belambo
 Bobakindro
 Daraina
 Fanambana
 Maromokotra
 Milanoa
 Nosibe
 Tsarabaria
 Vohemar

References and notes

Districts of Sava Region